Kostomlaty pod Milešovkou is a municipality and village in Teplice District in the Ústí nad Labem Region of the Czech Republic. It has about 900 inhabitants.

Administrative parts
The villages of Hlince is an administrative part of Kostomlaty pod Milešovkou.

References

Villages in Teplice District